Stage Fright is a 1987 Italian slasher film directed by Michael Soavi, and starring Barbara Cupisti, David Brandon, and Giovanni Lombardo Radice. The plot involves a group of stage actors and crew who lock themselves inside a theater for rehearsal of a musical production, unaware that an escaped mental patient is locked inside with them.

Plot
Late at night, inside a theater, a troupe of actors and crew consisting of the director Peter, Alicia, Mark, Sybil, Betty, Corinne, Laurel, Danny, Brett, and Ferrari are rehearsing a musical about a fictional mass murderer known as the Night Owl. Peter is very dominating over the group and tries to keep them from leaving under any circumstances without his permission. When Alicia sprains her ankle, she and Betty sneak out of rehearsal for medical assistance, the closest being a mental hospital. When speaking to the psychiatrist, Betty notices an imprisoned patient named Irving Wallace, a former actor who had gone insane and committed a killing spree. Unbeknownst to any of them, Wallace killed one of the attendants with a syringe and snuck out of the asylum to hide inside Betty's car.

Upon returning, Peter fires Alicia for leaving during the rehearsal. Outside, Betty returns to the car only to be murdered by Wallace with a pickaxe to the mouth. Moments later, Alicia finds her body and contacts the police. The body is removed, and two officers are stationed outside the premises.

Meanwhile, Peter creates an idea by altering the play's script; he renames the show's antagonist to Irving Wallace instead of an ambiguous killer and insists that everyone (including rehired Alicia) stay the night to begin immediate rehearsals with the new material. The group reluctantly agrees to stay with the promise of additional cash, and Corinne hides the theater's exit key. While changing her costume, Laurel is stalked by a shadowy figure whom she thinks to be Brett. Brett then stays behind to search for his costume, not noticing Wallace donning the theater's owl costume behind him.

Peter rehearses a scene with Corinne. Unbeknownst to the others, its Wallace in the owl costume who approaches Corinne before grabbing and strangling her. He pulls out a knife and stabs Corinne several times, killing her, while the others watch in shock. Without the keys whereabouts, the group begins to panic, as they discover the killer has diconnected the phone lines to prevent them from contacting the officers. While the group tries to find an escape route, Ferrari is stabbed by Wallace, who hangs his body subsequently being found by the group.

While Peter and Danny leave the group inside a room to search for the killer, Laurel notices Wallace outside trying to open the door, and the group barricades it. The killer then breaks the window to grab Mark before killing him with a power drill through the door. Peter and Danny return, and, upon witnessing Mark's murder, they plan to stick together and defend themselves.

While the group moves on to the stage, Peter notices the killer up on the upper catwalks and goes after him while asking the others to corner him too. Laurel leaves Alicia behind after accidentally knocking her out. Peter then hacks up the missing Brett (who is donning a similar owl costume and is unknowingly tied up) with an axe, thinking he was Wallace. Soon, Sybil is grabbed by the killer and is pulled into the floor. Danny and Peter grab her arms and try to pull her up, but, as a result, Sybil is torn in half. Danny immediately goes down and is also killed by Wallace with a chainsaw. Cornering Peter and Laurel, Wallace wounds Laurel and cuts off Peter's arm before the chainsaw runs out of fuel. The killer takes the axe and ultimately decapitates the director.

Alicia wakes up and finds a wounded Laurel hiding in the shower room. While she hides, Wallace grabs Laurel and stabs her before dragging her body away. Alicia arms herself and searches for the key, only to see Wallace sitting next to the group's bodies placed around the stage and covered with feathers.

She successfully finds the key underneath the stage and defends herself against Wallace before going up to the catwalks. As Wallace corners her, she sprays a fire extinguisher into his face, knocking him over and leaving him hanging onto a loose cable. After the cable is severed and the killer falls, Alicia makes her way to the door, but Wallace attacks again. She dumps a burning bin onto him, igniting him, then escapes the theater and tells the police about the events. The next morning, Alicia returns to the theater to find her missing watch and she is let in by a man named Willy. Willy remarks that the gun Alicia found was loaded but she had the safety on, and he repeatedly says that if he'd been in her situation he would have shot Wallace right between the eyes. Willy comments that according to the newspaper only eight bodies were found, when there should have been nine including Wallace, at which point an unmasked and scarred Wallace appears and prepares to attack Alicia. Willy shoots the killer in the head, then Willy appears to go into shock as he keeps repeating about how he did indeed get Wallace "right between the eyes" while a disturbed Alicia walks out carrying the broken watch. Wallace then looks at the camera and smirks, apparently having survived his headshot.

Cast

 Barbara Cupisti as Alicia
 David Brandon as Peter
 Mary Sellers as Laurel
 Robert Gligorov as Danny
 Jo Ann Smith as Sybil
 Giovanni Lombardo Radice as Brett
 Martin Philips as Mark
 Piero Vida as Ferrari
 Loredana Parrella as Corinne
 Ulrike Schwerk as Betty
 Domenico Fiore as Police Chief
 Mickey Knox as Old Cop
 Michele Soavi as Young Cop
 James Sampson as Willy (as James E. R. Sampson)
 Clain Parker as Irving Wallace
 Luigi Montefiori as Masked Irving Wallace (uncredited)

Production
The film marks the directorial debut of Dario Argento protégé Michele Soavi and was produced by Joe D'Amato.

Soavi stated that on Stage Fright he "didn't feel ready to direct, but of course I said yes when I was offered a chance."

Release
Stage Fright was released in 1987. It was also released outside of Italy as Bloody Bird and Aquarius.

Critical response

AllMovie awarded the film three out of five stars, writing: "Stage Fright is primarily for the horror audience but they are likely to enjoy its visually inventive approach to the usually humdrum slasher subgenre", calling the film "a good example of how style can triumph over substance in a genre effort" and praising Soavi's direction.

References

Footnotes

Sources

External links
 
 

1987 films
1987 horror films
1980s slasher films
English-language Italian films
Films directed by Michele Soavi
Films about actors
Films set in a theatre
Films set in the United States
Films scored by Simon Boswell
Films scored by Stefano Mainetti
Italian independent films
Italian slasher films
Italian serial killer films
1980s Italian films
Italian exploitation films
Italian splatter films